Love Letters from Everest is a Canadian short animated documentary film, directed by Celeste Koon and released in 2019. The film centres on the love letters written between Koon's grandparents, Fritz Müller and Barbara Battle, during Müller's 1956 research expedition to Mount Everest. The roles of her grandparents are voiced by Jakob Josten and Laura Meadows.

The film premiered at the Doc NYC festival in October 2019, and had its Canadian premiere in February 2020 on CBC Gem.

The film received two Canadian Screen Award nominations at the 9th Canadian Screen Awards in 2021, for Best Web Program or Series, Non-Fiction and Best Direction in a Web Program or Series (Koon).

References

External links

2019 films
Canadian short documentary films
Canadian animated short films
Canadian animated documentary films
2010s English-language films
2010s Canadian films
2019 short documentary films